Richard Bannister may refer to:

Richard Matthew Bannister (born 1957), British media executive
Richard Banister (died 1626), sometimes spelt Bannister, English oculist